Ivan Vasilyevich Dvorny (5 January 1952, Yasnaya Polyana, Moskalensky District, Omsk Oblast – 21 September 2015, Omsk) was a Russian basketball player who won gold with the Soviet basketball team at the 1972 Summer Olympics. He trained at VSS Trud in Sverdlovsk, as well as in Omsk and in Leningrad

Dvorny died on 21 September 2015 in Omsk of lung cancer at the age of 63.

References

1952 births
2015 deaths
People from Omsk Oblast
Basketball players at the 1972 Summer Olympics
BC Spartak Saint Petersburg players
Olympic basketball players of the Soviet Union
Olympic gold medalists for the Soviet Union
Olympic medalists in basketball
Russian men's basketball players
Soviet men's basketball players
Medalists at the 1972 Summer Olympics
BC Ural Yekaterinburg players
Centers (basketball)
Sportspeople convicted of crimes